Nemacheilus olivaceus is a species of stone loach native to the benthopelagic freshwaters and tropical climates of such countries as: Indonesia and Malaysia.

They are omnivores and their diet consist primarily of macro algae, smaller fish, aquatic weeds, and more.

Footnotes 
 

O
Fish described in 1894